KPVL (89.1 FM) is a non-commercial community radio station licensed to Postville, Iowa, United States. The station is currently owned by Community Public Media and managed by Radio Postville, Inc.

History
89.1 KPVL is an independent, non-commercial community radio station that went on the air in December 2002 with a mission to meet the needs of Postville's diverse community.

Programs produced in Hebrew, Spanish, and Russian provided Postville's emerging immigrant populations with a reliable link to community news, issues, and events. Other educational and public affairs shows celebrated local culture and served as a platform for community dialog & understanding.

KPVL's main broadcast studio is now located in downtown Decorah and a second volunteer training / production studio is also maintained in Postville. A recently completed power increase to the station's transmitter now brings community radio to the greater four-county area of Northeast Iowa.

Excerpt from 10/12/10 Decorah Newspaper Article:

In 2002, Pastor Robert Hupp — a Lutheran pastor and licensed broadcasting engineer who was working at KCZQ radio in Cresco — was thinking it would be a great idea to start a non-profit, multi-lingual radio station in Postville.

At the time, the small town was home not only to the descendants of the (mostly) Germans and (some) Scandinavians who'd settled it 150 years earlier but, more recently, to people from Mexico, Ukraine, and Russia – in addition to a community of about 400 Hasidic Jews, all of whom made their way there after the arrival in 1987 of AgriProcessors, then the largest kosher slaughterhouse and meatpacking plant in the country.

Into that multi-cultural context, “Radio Postville” – 89.1 KPVL – was born. One of a few pioneering radio stations in the country to broadcast in multiple languages, it featured talk shows, area news, weather updates, educational programs and music.

Carolyn Corbin, now of Decorah, worked in Postville at the time and was a Radio Postville advisory board member. In a 2002 interview for The Tapestry magazine, she told reporter Elsa Carruthers about the board's vision for KPVL.

“Besides having a place to tune into where people can hear their own language, there is also a place to share stories and to be able to broadcast in different languages as a way of getting to know about other cultures,” she said. “Sort of a meeting place. A meeting place on the air.”

In 2002, the 30-watt station could be heard only in Postville. When it went to 300 watts, where it remained for quite a while, it could be heard in some of the outlying areas around town, as well.

And so it went until May 12, 2008 — when Immigrations and Customs Enforcement (ICE) agents conducted a raid on AgriProcessors, arresting almost 400 undocumented workers.

Two years later, a Decorah Newspapers article reported on a discussion of the raid's aftermath held at a public gathering in Decorah, during which Luther College Campus Pastor David Vásquez said Postville was still reeling from the effects of that raid.

“There are four pillars to any community — the church, the town hall, schools and Main Street businesses,” Vásquez said. “All of these were devastated by the raid.”

Under the management of Jeff Abbas, KPVL's studio in Postville functioned for a while as a kind of clearinghouse for support and outreach in the community. Abbas helped people find work, ran a food pantry out of the station and kept news of the raid's ongoing effects on the air and in the public consciousness.

But, said Adam Wiltgen, Station Manager from 2010 - 2012, “After the raid, the town’s capacity to support a radio station really eroded.”

That's the bad news. The good news is that the future is looking brighter for the little community radio station that just won't give up. Though KPVL moved its main studio to Decorah in February 2010, it maintains a studio in Postville, broadcasts Postville High School Athletics, and also airs the popular “Noche Latina” — hosted by longtime Spanish-language broadcaster Elmer Herrera, of Postville, and co-hosted by Israel Martinez and Walter Ortiz – live, Saturday evenings, from 7 until 11.
 
In 2015, KPVL ceased broadcasting.

References

External links
 KPVL Archives
 

PVL
Public radio stations in the United States